is a railway station in Bungo-Ōno, Ōita Prefecture, Japan. It is operated by JR Kyushu and is on the Hōhi Main Line.

Lines

Layout 
The station consists of a side platform serving a single track. The station building is a modern structure but built in  traditional Japanese style with a tiled roof. It houses a waiting room, a ticket booth (unstaffed) and the local tourism information centre.

Adjacent stations

History
The track was extended westwards in phases, with this station opening as the new western terminus on 20 December 1923. On 2 December 1928, the entire track from Kumamoto through Asaji to Ōita was designated as the Hōhi Main Line. With the privatization of Japanese National Railways (JNR), the successor of JGR, on 1 April 1987, the station came under the control of JR Kyushu.

The station became unstaffed in 1983. A new station building was completed in 1993.

On 17 September 2017, Typhoon Talim (Typhoon 18) damaged the Hōhi Main Line at several locations. Services between Aso and Nakahanda, including Asaji, were suspended and replaced by bus services. Rail service from Aso through Asaji to Miemachi was restored by 22 September 2017 Normal rail services between Aso and Ōita were restored by 2 October 2017.

Passenger statistics
In fiscal 2015, there were a total of 32,490  boarding passengers, giving a daily average of 89 passengers.

See also
List of railway stations in Japan

References

External links
Asaji (JR Kyushu)

Railway stations in Ōita Prefecture
Railway stations in Japan opened in 1923
Bungo-ōno, Ōita